B. K. Gadhvi also known as Bhairavdanji K Gadhvi (1937 – 2005) was a leader of the Indian National Congress from Gujarat and was a member of the Seventh, Eighth and Eleventh Lok Sabhas from 1980 to 1989 and from 1996 to 2004 representing the Banaskantha Parliamentary Constituency.  He was also the Union Minister of State for Finance from 1986 to 1989. He has also served as the President of Gujarat Pradesh Congress Committee from 2003-2005. He also served as an MLA in Gujarat and also served as an Cabinet Minister in Gujarat Government.

References

2005 deaths
Lok Sabha members from Gujarat
People from Banaskantha district
India MPs 1980–1984
India MPs 1984–1989
1937 births
India MPs 1996–1997

Charan
Gadhavi (surname)
Indian National Congress politicians from Gujarat